Đorđe Despotović (born 4 March 1992) is a Serbian footballer who plays as a centre forward for Russian club Arsenal Tula.

Career
In February 2015, Despotović moved on loan to FC Zhetysu for six-months. In July 2015 he went for another loan move to FC Kairat. The following February, Despotović signed for FC Astana.

On 15 February 2017, Despotović moved to FC Tobol on loan for the 2017 season, but the loan was cut short and Despotović returned to Astana on 15 June 2017. Despotović left Astana on 23 July 2018 at the end of his contract.

On 31 August 2018, Despotović signed for FC Orenburg. On 1 June 2020, Despotović left FC Orenburg after his contract had expired.

On 21 July 2020, he signed a 3-year contract with another Russian Premier League club Rubin Kazan. On 30 January 2022, his contract with Rubin was terminated by mutual consent.

On 2 February 2022, Despotović signed a 3-year contract with Arsenal Tula.

Career statistics

Club

Honours

Player

Club
Lokeren
Belgian Cup: 2013–14

Kairat
Kazakhstan Cup: 2015

Astana
Kazakhstan Premier League: 2016, 2017
Kazakhstan Cup: 2016
Kazakhstan Super Cup: 2018

References

External links
 Đorđe Despotović Stats at Utakmica.rs
 Djordje Despotović Stats at UEFA

1992 births
Living people
Sportspeople from Loznica
Serbian footballers
Serbia youth international footballers
Serbia under-21 international footballers
Association football forwards
FK Spartak Subotica players
Red Star Belgrade footballers
K.S.C. Lokeren Oost-Vlaanderen players
FK Spartaks Jūrmala players
Serbian SuperLiga players
Belgian Pro League players
Kazakhstan Premier League players
Serbian expatriate footballers
Serbian expatriate sportspeople in Kazakhstan
Expatriate footballers in Kazakhstan
Serbian expatriate sportspeople in Belgium
Expatriate footballers in Belgium
FC Astana players
FC Orenburg players
FC Rubin Kazan players
FC Arsenal Tula players
Expatriate footballers in Russia
Russian Premier League players
Serbian expatriate sportspeople in Russia
Russian First League players